Aponia minnithalis is a moth in the family Crambidae. It was described by Druce in 1895. It is found in Guatemala and Panama.

References

Moths described in 1895
Pyraustinae
Moths of Central America